Haluk Ulusoy (born on 6 May 1958 in Trabzon) is the former president of Turkish Football Federation. His initially held the post between 1997 and 2004, but was re-elected for a second spell in 2006.

Awards
2002 Turkish State Medal of Distinguished Service

References

1958 births
Living people
People from Trabzon
Turkish Football Federation presidents
Recipients of the State Medal of Distinguished Service
Turkish sports executives and administrators